Lawrence Jordan (born 1934 ) is an American independent filmmaker who is most widely known for his animated collage films. In 1970 he received a Guggenheim Fellowship to make Sacred Art of Tibet.

Legacy
Our Lady of the Sphere, inspired by the Book of Tibet, was inducted into the National Film Registry in 2010.

Selected filmography
Trumpit (1956) - with Stan Brakhage
Gymnopédies (1965)
Hamfat Asar (1965)
Our Lady of the Sphere (1972)
Rime of the Ancient Mariner (1977)
Visions of a City (1978)
Carabosse (1980)
Sophie's Place (1986)
Poet's Dream (2005)

See also
 Stan Brakhage, mentor and friend of Larry Jordan
 Joseph Cornell, a filmmaker who Larry worked as assistant/editor
 Bruce Conner, another friend of Larry Jordan

References

External links
 on IMDb
Lawrence Jordan official site
Lawrence Jordan's films distributed by Canyon Cinema
 on Ubuweb
Films distributed by The Film-makers' Cooperative, New York
Films distributed by LUX, London

1934 births
Living people
Artists from California
American contemporary artists
Postmodern artists
American animators
American animated film directors
Collage filmmakers
Artists from the San Francisco Bay Area
American experimental filmmakers